Statistics of Empress's Cup in the 1995 season.

Overview
It was contested by 20 teams, and Fujita SC Mercury won the championship.

Results

1st round
OKI Lady Thunders 1-3 Takarazuka Bunnys
Chukyo Women's University 4-1 FC Shibecha
Jonan Ladies 3-4 Akita FC
Tokyo Shidax LSC 6-0 Socius Amigo

2nd round
Prima Ham FC Kunoichi 2-1 Takarazuka Bunnys
Ishinomaki Women's Commercial High School 1-9 Tasaki Perule FC
Yomiuri-Seiyu Beleza 13-1 Toyama Ladies SC
Chukyo Women's University 0-9 Matsushita Electric Panasonic Bambina
Suzuyo Shimizu FC Lovely Ladies 11-0 Akita FC
Japan Women's College of Physical Education 0-8 Fujita SC Mercury
Shiroki FC Serena 7-0 Matsushita Electric Panasonic Ragazza
Tokyo Shidax LSC 1-0 Nikko Securities Dream Ladies

Quarterfinals
Prima Ham FC Kunoichi 4-0 Tasaki Perule FC
Yomiuri-Seiyu Beleza 1-0 Matsushita Electric Panasonic Bambina
Suzuyo Shimizu FC Lovely Ladies 2-2 (pen 1-3) Fujita SC Mercury
Shiroki FC Serena 0-0 (pen 2-3) Tokyo Shidax LSC

Semifinals
Prima Ham FC Kunoichi 1-1 (pen 3-4) Yomiuri-Seiyu Beleza
Fujita SC Mercury 1-0 Tokyo Shidax LSC

Final
Yomiuri-Seiyu Beleza 2-3 Fujita SC Mercury
Fujita SC Mercury won the championship.

References

Empress's Cup
1995 in Japanese women's football